The 1952 NASCAR Grand National Series was the fourth season of the premier stock car racing championship sanctioned by NASCAR. Once the season was concluded, driver Tim Flock was crowned the Grand National champion after winning 8 of the 33 events that he competed in.  This was the first year that NASCAR scheduled its events to avoid the conflicts of having two races, at two different tracks, on the same day.  The only exception was on June 1, when races were held at both Toledo Speedway in Ohio, and Hayloft Speedway in Augusta, Georgia.  Herb Thomas finished second to Flock after competing in 32 races, and Lee Petty finished third in the standings that year.  Throughout the 1952 season, a total of 261 drivers entered at least one of the 34 events. Virtually every American car manufacturer had at least one of their cars start that season.

This was also the first season that sponsors such as Pure Oil Co (which later became Union 76, and eventually Unocal), and Champion Spark Plug Inc. started paying contingency award monies in exchange for the publicity they received by drivers sponsoring their products.

1952 season recap 

The 1952 NASCAR Grand National season was dominated by Hudson automobiles, winning 27 of the scheduled 34 races. No other make won more than three times.  The reason the Hudson Hornet was so successful, winning over 80 NASCAR races between 1951 and 1955, has been attributed to its low center of gravity, "mono-built" body and center point steering system.  The center point steering system contributed to the car's superior handling and cornering abilities; allowing the vehicle to excel on the dirt-covered race tracks of the day.

Palm Beach Speedway in West Palm Beach, Florida, was a half-mile, dirt track that saw its first NASCAR event when it opened the 1952 NASCAR season on January 20, 1952.  The 100-mile event was slowed by two caution flags, and was won by driver Tim Flock.  Six-thousand fans were on hand to see Flock capture his first of eight victories in the 1952 season.  Flock started on the pole, and drove his No. 91 1951 Hudson, sponsored by Ted Chester, to victory. He claimed his $1,025 winnings with only five drivers still running at the end of the race.  Flock captured the pole position for the race in 27.78 seconds, with an average speed of 64.79 mph.  The second event of the 1952 season took place on the famed 4.1 mile road course of Daytona Beach Speedway, and driver Marshall Teague took the victory in a 1952 Hudson.  Herb Thomas led the first lap of the event, but Teague managed to lead laps 2 to 37. Twenty-thousand spectators witnessed 61 drivers start the event; but at the end of the race, only 10 cars were still running.  The race was eventually halted on lap 37 due to the incoming tide which encroached on the beachfront straight of the track.  The third event of the season took place at the half-mile dirt track of Speedway Park in Jacksonville, Florida.  Marshall Teague won his second race in a row in the 200 lap, 100 mile contest, defeating the other 28 drivers.

On June 29, NASCAR traveled to Detroit, Michigan, for a scheduled 250-mile event, dubbed the "Motor Sports 250".  The race was held at the Michigan State Fairgrounds Speedway; a one-mile dirt oval built in 1899.  NASCAR offered its first five-figured purse, of $11,675, to the contestants, and driver Tim Flock came away with the winner's share of $5,050.  Fans watched as Flock led laps 88 – 110, until driver Buddy Shuman took the lead for one lap on the 111th circuit.  Flock, with the fourth and final lead change, on the next lap, went on to lead the remaining laps of the event.  Shuman finished the event in second place, capturing a total of $2,225.  The event concluded after four hours, with over half of the 47 contestants still running at the drop of the checkered flag.

For the 25th race of the season, fans and drivers assembled at the Darlington Raceway on September 1.  The purse for the 400-lap, 500-mile event was $23,855; after six lead changes, and seven caution flags, Fonty Flock took home the winner's trophy with an average speed of 74.5 mph.  Over 32,000 fans watched as Flock's victory in his number 14, 1952 Oldsmobile, netted him a $9,430 check for over 6.5 hours of driving.  Flock started on the pole, and led the first 17 laps before the first lead change between four drivers.  Flock recaptured the lead for the final time on lap 185.  Eventual season champion Tim Flock and his No. 91 Hudson were involved in an accident on lap 321, but Flock stepped in and replaced driver Jack Smith in the No. 9.  While Flock drove the No. 9 Hudson to an 11th-place finish, he was credited with finishing 34th of the 66 starters, and Smith was awarded the 11th place points.

Palm Beach Speedway both opened and closed the 1952 NASCAR season when it held the 34th and final event on October 30, 1952.  Herb Thomas won three of the final four races in the season to finish second in the final standings.  Thomas claimed the final victory of the season, winning the event with a two lap advantage over second-place Fonty Flock.

1952 Race schedule and results

Individual races

West Palm Beach, FL.; Palm Beach Speedway 

Race (1) Top 10 finishers
 91,	Tim Flock
 42,	Lee Petty
 14,	Fonty Flock
 88,	Frankie Schneider
 17,	Buddy Shuman
 7,	Frank Mundy
 787,	Jim Millard
 86,	Bill Davis
 9,	Ed Samples
 36,	Al Funderburk

Daytona Beach, FL; Daytona Beach Road Course 

Race (2) Top 10 finishes
 6,	Marshall Teague
 92,	Herb Thomas
 99,	Pat Kirkwood
 14,	Fonty Flock
 51,	Gober Sosebee
 2,	Bill Blair
 40,	Tommy Thompson
 57,	Tommy Moon
 42,	Lee Petty
 59,	Lloyd Moore

Jacksonville, FL.; Speedway Park 
Race (3) Top 10 finishes

 6,	Marshall Teague
 92,	Herb Thomas
 88,	Frankie Schneider
 91,	Tim Flock
 57,	Tommy Moon
 14,	Fonty Flock
 72,	Donald Thomas
 47,	Jim Reed
 1,	Dick Eagan
 78,	Bob Moore

North Wilkesboro, NC; North Wilkesboro Speedway 
Race (4) Top 10 finishes; Wilkes County 200
 92	Herb Thomas
 14	Fonty Flock
 2	Bill Blair
 72	Donald Thomas
 126	Dave Terrell
 	Neil Cole
 17	Buddy Shuman
 60	Jim Paschal
 42	Lee Petty
 	Otis Martin

Martinsville, VA; Martinsville Speedway 

Race (5) Top 10 finishes
 120	Dick Rathmann
 2	Bill Blair
 22	Perk Brown
 42	Lee Petty
 	Bobby Courtwright
	Neil Cole
 38	Clyde Minter
 92	Herb Thomas
 88	Frankie Schneider
 60	Jim Paschal

Columbia NC.; Columbia Speedway 
Race (6) Top 10 finishes

 89,	Buck Baker
 42,	Lee Petty
 120,	Dick Rathmann
 88,	Frankie Schneider
 82,	Joe Eubanks
 72,	Donald Thomas
 17,	Buddy Shuman
 60,	Jim Paschal
 77,	Jack Smith
 18,	Jimmy Florian

Atlanta, GA.; Lakewood Speedway 
Race (7) Top 10 finishes

2,	Bill Blair
9,	Ed Samples
42,	Lee Petty
89,	Buck Baker
118,	Ed Benedict
128,	Charles Gattalia
4,	Fonty Flock
92,	Herb Thomas
51,	Gober Sosebee
18,	Jimmy Florian

Macon GA.; Central City Speedway 
Race (8) Top 10 finishes

92,	Herb Thomas
14,	Fonty Flock
9,	Ed Samples
89,	Buck Baker
51,	Gober Sosebee
60,	Jim Paschal
42,	Lee Petty
72,	Donald Thomas
91,	Tim Flock
128,	Charles Gattalia

Langhorne, PA; Langhorne Speedway 
Race (9) Top 10 finishes

120,	Dick Rathmann
91,	Tim Flock
42,	Lee Petty
421,	Jack Reynolds
14,	Fonty Flock
89,	Buck Baker
	Tom Dawson
126,	Dave Terrell
	Bud Farrell
2,	Bill Blair

Darlington, SC; Darlington Raceway 
Race (10) Top 10 finishes

120,	Dick Rathmann
91,	Tim Flock
14,	Fonty Flock
2,	Jimmie Lewallen
82,	Joe Eubanks
72,	Donald Thomas
42,	Lee Petty
11,	Fireball Roberts
41,	Jim Paschal
7,	Frank Mundy

Dayton, OH; Dayton Speedway 
Race (11) Top 10 finishes

120,	Dick Rathmann
59,	Lloyd Moore
91,	Tim Flock
42,	Lee Petty
72,	Donald Thomas
82,	Herb Thomas
41,	Jim Paschal
128,	Charles Gattalia
421,	Jack Reynolds
22,	Perk Brown

Canfield, OH; Canfield Speedway 
Race (12) Top 10 finishes; Poor Man's 500

92,	Herb Thomas
2,	Bill Blair
78,	Bob Moore
91,	Tim Flock
41,	Curtis Turner
82,	Joe Eubanks
44,	Jimmie Lewallen
	Bill Rexford
93,	Ted Chamberlain
	Ernie Boost

Augusta, GA; Hayloft Speedway 
Race (13) Top 10 finishes

51,	Gober Sosebee
57,	Tommy Moon
	David Ezell
17,	June Cleveland
	Jerry Wimbish
16,	Bill Snowden
77,	Weldon Adams
126,	Dave Terrell
72,	Donald Thomas
9,	Ed Samples

Toledo, OH.; Fort Miami Speedway 
Race (14) Top 10 finishes

91,	Tim Flock
120,	Dick Rathmann
42,	Lee Petty
44,	Ray Duhigg
14,	Fonty Flock
22,	Perk Brown
82,	Joe Eubanks
 	Bud Farrell
421,	Jack Reynolds
 	Ralph Liguori

Hillsboro, NC.; Occoneechee Speedway 
Race (15) Top 10 finishes

91,	Tim Flock
14,	Fonty Flock
120,	Dick Rathmann
2,	Bill Blair
 	Jimmie Lewallen
42,	Lee Petty
82,	Joe Eubanks
44,	Ray Duhigg
 	Clyde Minter
72,	Donald Thomas

Charlotte, NC; Charlotte Speedway 
Race (16) Top 10 finishes

92,	Herb Thomas
91,	Tim Flock
2,	Bill Blair
42,	Lee Petty
120, 	Dick Rathmann
66,	Donald Thomas
82,	Joe Eubanks
89,	Buddy Shuman
17,	June Cleveland
19, 	Fred Dove

Detroit, MI; Michigan State Fairgrounds Speedway 
Race (17) Top 10 finishes Motor City 250

91,	Tim Flock
89,	Buddy Shuman
92,	Herb Thomas
2,	Bill Blair
99, 	Pat Kirkwood
77,	Dick Passwater
3,	Hershel McGriff
73,	Stewart Joyce
4,	Otis Martin
34, 	Ted Chamberlain

Niagara Falls, Ontario, Canada; Stamford Park 
Seventeen cars competed in the event, only three were running at the end.

Race (18) Top 10 finishes

89,	Buddy Shuman
92,	Herb Thomas
44,	Ray Duhigg
421,	Jack Reynolds
 	Perk Brown
	Neil Cole
	Fonty Flock
118,	Bucky Sager
93,	Ted Chamberlain
	Albert Lemieux

Owego, NY; Shangri-La Speedway 
Race (19) Top 10 finishes

91,	Tim Flock
92,	Herb Thomas
120,	Dick Rathmann
118,	Bucky Sager
42, 	Lee Petty
59,	Lloyd Moore
44,	Ray Duhigg
421,	Jack Reynolds
	Neil Cole
 	Walt Carver

Monroe, MI; Monroe Speedway 
Race (20) Top 10 finishes

91,	Tim Flock
92,	Herb Thomas
42, 	Lee Petty
14,	Fonty Flock
44, 	Ray Duhigg
84,	Red Duvall
93,	Ted Chamberlain
	Iggy Katona
162,	Fred Bethune
 	Bob Moore

Morristown, NJ; Morristown Speedway 
Race (21) Top 10 finishes

42, 	Lee Petty
91,	Tim Flock
 	Neil Cole
	Ralph Liguori
 	Ronnie Kohler
	Pappy Hough
	Nelson Applegate
	Jim Reed
93,	Ted Chamberlain
 	Eddie Van Horn

South Bend, IN; Playland Park
Race (22) Top 10 finishes

91, 	Tim Flock
42,	Lee Petty
55, 	Bub King
4,	Herschel Buchanan
77, 	Dick Passwater
8,	Gene Comstock
	Glen Larsen
94,	J. O. Staton
118,	Bucky Sager
84,	Red Duvall

Rochester, NY; Monroe County Fairgrounds 
Race (23) Top 10 finishes

91, 	Tim Flock
92,	Herb Thomas
120 	Dick Rathmann
42,	Lee Petty
7, 	Jim Reed
8,	Jimmie Lewallen
	Yay Duhigg
94,	J. O. Staton
118,	Bucky Sager
84,	Red Duvall

Weaverville, NC; Asheville-Weaverville Speedway 
Race (24) Top 10 finishes

7,	Bob Flock
91,	Tim Flock
92,	Herb Thomas
8,	Gene Comstock
1,	Herschel Buchanan
	Barney Smith
66,	Donald Thomas
71,	Coleman Lawrence
54,	Weldon Adams
89,	Buck Baker

Darlington, SC; Darlington Raceway 
Race (25) Southern 500 Top 10 finishes

14,	Fonty Flock
58,	Johnny Patterson
92,	Herb Thomas
55,	Bub King
16,	Banjo Matthews
42,	Lee Petty
82,	Joe Eubanks
1,	Herschel Buchanan
87,	Buck Baker
24,	Ray Duhigg

Macon, Ga; Central City Speedway 
Race (26) Top 10 finishes

42,	Lee Petty
92,	Herb Thomas
91,	Tim Flock
82,	Joe Eubanks
1,	Herschel Buchanan
32,	Jimmie Lewallen
66,	Donald Thomas
	Carson Dyer
93,	Ted Chamberlain
	Barney Smith

Langhorne, PA; Langhorne Speedway 
Race (27) Top 10 finishes

42,	Lee Petty
2,	Bill Blair
1,	Herschel Buchanan
91,	Tim Flock
120,	Dick Rathmann
4,	Slick Smith
	Neil Cole
24,	Ray Duhigg
	Jack Reynolds
167,	Elton Hildreth

Dayton, OH; Dayton Speedway 
Top 10 finishes

120,	Dick Rathmanns
42,	Lee Petty
24,	Ray Duhigg
59,	Lloyd Moore
92,	Herb Thomas
91,	Tim Flock
	Iggy Katona
77,	Dick Passwater
18,	Ed Benedict
	Herschel White

Wilson, NC; Wilson Speedway 
Race (29) Top 10 finishes

92,	Herb Thomas
42,	Lee Petty
2,	Bill Blair
12,	Jim Paschal
120,	Dick Rathmann
17,	Buddy Shuman
91,	Tim Flock
4,	Slick Smith
32,	Jimmie Lewallen
71,	Coleman Lawrence

Hillsboro, NC; Occoneechee Speedway 
Race (30) Top 10 finishes

14,	Fonty Flock
9,	Donald Thomas
2,	Bill Blair
91,	Tim Flock
42,	Lee Petty
55,	Bub King
24,	Ray Duhigg
4,	Slick Smith
19,	Fred Dove
	George Bush

Martinsville, VA; Martinsville Speedway 
Race (31) Top 10 finishes

92,	Herb Thomas
14,	Fonty Flock
42,	Lee Petty
91,	Tim Flock
42,	Lee Petty
58,	Johnny Patterson
2,	Bill Blair
	Julian Petty
	Clyde Minter
	Cotton Owens
	Ralph Liguori

North Wilkesboro, NC; North Wilkesboro Speedway 
Race (32) Top 10 finishes

9,	Herb Thomas
14,	Fonty Flock
92,	Donald Thomas
91,	Tim Flock
120,	Dick Rathmann
	Jimmie Lewallen
22,	Perk Brown
19,	Fred Dove
55,	Bub King
71,	Coleman Lawrence

Atlanta, GA; Lakewood Speedway 
Race (33) Top 10 finishes

9,	Donald Thomas
42,	Lee Petty
82,	Joe Eubanks
91,	Tim Flock
51,	Gober Sosebee
120,	Jack Smith
	George Bush
	Ralph Liguori
8,	Gene Comstock
55,	Bub King

Palm Beach, FL; Palm Beach Speedway 
Race (34) Top 10 finishers
 92	Herb Thomas
 14	Fonty Flock
 22	Perk Brown
 42	Lee Petty
 	Marion Edwards
 	Rags Carter
 13	Pop McGinnis
 	Ralph Liguori
 3	Allan Clarke
 	George Bush

1952 Grand National final standings 

Tim Flock, 8 wins in 34 races, 6,858.5 points, $22,890 in earnings
Herb Thomas, 8 wins in 32 starts, 6,752.5 points
Lee Petty 3 wins in 32 starts, 6,498.5 points
Fonty Flock
Dick Rathmann
Bill Blair
Joe Eubanks
Ray Duhigg
Donald Thomas
Buddy Shuman
Ted Chamberlain
Buck Baker
Perk Brown
Jimmie Lewallen
Bub King
Herschel Buchanan
Johnny Patterson
Jim Paschal
Neil Cole
Lloyd Moore
Gene Comstock
Banjo Matthews
Ralph Liguori
Jack Reynolds
Dick Passwater
Bucky Sager
Frankie Schneider
Otis Martin
Coleman Lawrence
Ed Samples
Fred Dove
Slick Smith
Iggy Katona
Jack Smith
Tommy Moon

Other notable drivers with at least one start include: Speedy Thompson, Curtis Turner, Louise Smith, Frank Mundy, Hershel McGriff, Marshall Teague, Nelson Stacy, Bill Rexford, Bob Welborn, Gober Sosebee, Bill Snowden, Fireball Roberts, George Bush, champ car racer Al Keller, Bob Flock, Cotton Owens, Joe Weatherly, crew chief Smokey Yunick, and Dutch Hoag.

References 

 
NASCAR Cup Series seasons